The Budapest bid for the 2024 Summer Olympics and Summer Paralympics was announced by the Hungarian Olympic Committee on 11 November 2013, although organisers had been planning a bid since 2008. However, on March 1, 2017, Budapest withdrew its bid to host the 2024 Summer Olympics, leaving only Los Angeles and Paris in the race.

Bid history
In February 2015, the MOB recommended that the bid plan go forward and with the General Assembly of Budapest began work on detailed cooperation for the Games. Then in January 2016, city authorities approved the master-plan for the potential Olympic Games locations.

The two candidate cities are Paris in 2024 and Los Angeles in 2028. Hamburg pulled out of the contest in November 2015 and Rome pulled out of the contest in September 2016. Budapest pulled out of the contest in February 2017.

Water and movement are the key elements of the Budapest 2024 logo, the result of a national contest that involved almost 200 artists, children, graphic designers, and students. It was designed by Graphasel Design Studio in 2016. This is fitting for an Olympic bid that features the River Danube as a backdrop and as the connecting artery to many of the Games facilities. The interaction of the city and the river would place Budapest in a scenic setting for the Games. The city itself is pedestrian- and cycle-friendly.

One of the world's top swimming nations with 25 swimming gold medals, Hungary hosted the 2017 World Aquatics Championships. In 2017, Hungary also hosted other championship events such as the Judo World Championships, European Youth Olympic Festival, and European University Basketball Championships. In 2018, Szeged hosted the World University Championships Canoe Sprint and Modern Pentathlon. In 2019, Budapest hosted the World Table Tennis Championships, as well as the European Maccabi games and in 2020, the capital co-hosted the UEFA European Football Championship.

On 27 January 2016, the General Assembly of Budapest approved a list of potential venues.

On 15 December 2016, though Budapest had been considered something of a dark horse in the competition to host the Games, the Hungarian capital continued to move ahead with its campaign.

Aftermath
On 22 February 2017, Budapest announced that it would withdraw its bid to host the 2024 Summer Olympics, leaving only Los Angeles and Paris in the race. Paris will host the 2024 Summer Olympics and Los Angeles will host the 2028 Summer Olympics.

There is now discussion between Budapest and the IOC about the city possibly hosting the 2023 Summer Youth Olympics.

In January 2021, Budapest resumed the discussion about a possible future Summer Olympics bid for 2032 and beyond.

Previous bids
Budapest's bid to host the 1916 Summer Olympics, 1920 Summer Olympics, 1936 Summer Olympics, 1944 Summer Olympics, and 1960 Summer Olympics but lost to Berlin (cancelled due to WWI), Antwerp, Berlin, London (cancelled due to World War II), and Rome respectively.

Venues
The 2024 Budapest Olympic bid sought to take advantage of the compactness of the city and co-location of venues along the River Danube and others around the Budapest area.

Budget 
Based on publicly available information covering earlier estimates of potential costs of an Olympic Games in Budapest, and considering international past experiences, as well as the framework of organisation of the Games set by the Olympic Agenda 2020, the direct costs associated to a potential Budapest Olympics could be estimated at between HUF 500 billion to HUF 1,000 billion (US$1.8 billion to US$3.6 billion).

Political commitment 
Budapest plan has seen opposition from the Együtt ('Together') party and two other minority parties in the General Assembly of Budapest. Some representatives on the council led calls for a public referendum on the issue but this came to an end in January 2016.

The Kúria, Hungary's supreme court, rejected a last-minute proposal that citizens should have the chance to have their say in a public vote.

Prime Minister Viktor Orbán's government has thrown its full support behind the Budapest bid. He has said in a speech: "Hungary believes that sport is always more important than any other political interest, and that is why it must never be diverted into the arena of political battles. The Government supports the bid." Orbán said, "We are not only competing for ourselves, but representing the whole region".

He said that over the past 120 years the Olympics have become a “ passion" of the Hungarian people, and this may have developed "because the Olympic spirit represents such a pure form of freedom that was once rare here in Central Europe".

In January 2016, former Hungarian president Pál Schmitt was appointed President of the Budapest 2024 Summer Olympic and Paralympic Games Bid Committee.

According to the research institute Nézőpont Intézet, support among Hungarians for hosting the Olympics has risen from 40% in August 2014 to 53% by January 2016. However, according to a research made by Publicus, in August 2016 only 45% supported the bid.

Controversy and referendum petition

Most of the opposition parties and civil organisations have criticised the government for the bid, accusing it with corruption and spending money on the Olympic Games instead of developing health care, education and transportation in Budapest.

In January 2017 a civil organisation called Momentum Movement started a petition to have a referendum for Budapest residents if they want to organize the Summer Olympics in 2024 or not. Several opposition parties, such as Lehet Más a Politika (LMP), Együtt, Párbeszéd Magyarországért (PM), Magyar Szocialista Párt (MSZP) and Demokratikus Koalíció (DK) joined the movement, as well as Magyar Kétfarkú Kutya Párt (MKKP), which also started a satiric poster campaign against the bid in February. A total of 138,527 signatures was required to be collected from Budapestians until 17 February 2017 to start a referendum that would be held in Budapest and only the residents of the capital city would be able to cast a valid vote.

266,151 signatures were submitted by Momentum on 17 February. Just three working days later, the government decided on 22 February that, instead of holding a referendum on the Olympic games, they withdraw the bid. The government cited the lack of unity for their decision, even though they were heavily criticised by the opposition for not organising a referendum.

References

External links 
 Budapest 2024
 Budapest 2024 on YouTube
 Budapest 2024 on Facebook

Candidature file
 Stage 1: Vision, Games Concept and Strategy
 Stage 2: Governance, Legal and Venue Funding

2024 Summer Olympics bids
Sport in Budapest